__notoc__
The "Idaean Dactyls" (Idaioi Daktyloi) is a lost poem that was attributed to Hesiod by the tenth-century encyclopedia known as the Suda. The ascription is doubtful, but two quotations of "Hesiod" in other ancient authors do concern the discovery of metals and have been tentatively assigned to this poem by modern editors. Details of this sort were presumably a focus of the poem, for the Idaean Dactyls of the title were mythological smelters who were credited with the invention of metallurgy, as is attested in this quotation from Clement of Alexandria:

Select editions and translations

Critical editions
 .
 .
 .

Translations
 .
 .
 .

Notes

Bibliography
 .
 .
 .

Ancient Greek epic poems
Lost poems
Hesiod